William Albert Burke (born November 25, 1966) is an American actor and songwriter. He is known for his role as Charlie Swan in Twilight and its sequels. In 2011, he played Cesaire in Red Riding Hood. In 2012, he was  cast as one of the lead characters, Miles Matheson, in the NBC science-fiction series Revolution. From 2015 to 2017, he starred in the CBS series Zoo. He has also appeared in the supernatural horror film Lights Out (2016) and the thriller Breaking In (2018).

Personal life
Burke was born in Bellingham, Washington.  He was married to actress Pollyanna Rose; they divorced in 2017. They have one daughter, actor Blusey LaRue Burke.

Career
His television credits include roles in Star Trek: Deep Space Nine (in the episode "Second Skin"), Party of Five, Gilmore Girls, Karen Sisco, Fringe, Monk, and The Closer (Season 4, episode 13, "Power of Attorney") playing Phillip Stroh, a serial rapist and murderer, a character revisited in Major Crimes (see below). His motion picture credits include Jane Austen's Mafia!, Along Came a Spider, Final Jeopardy, Flashpoint, Ladder 49, Fracture, and Three Days to Vegas.

He appeared in Feast of Love (2007), co-starring Selma Blair and Morgan Freeman, and he played Detective Eric Box in the film Untraceable (2008) with Diane Lane.

In 2008, Burke appeared in Twilight, based on the best-selling novel by Stephenie Meyer, playing the role of Charlie Swan. He also portrayed Bobby's brother, Jack, on the show My Boys. Burke reprised his role as Charlie Swan in the Twilight sequels, New Moon, Eclipse and Breaking Dawn – Part 1 and Part 2.

In February 2010, Burke was cast as Jonah King, the primary antagonist featured in the thriller Drive Angry, which was directed by Patrick Lussier and co-starred Amber Heard, Nicolas Cage, and William Fichtner. It was released on February 25, 2011. In July 2011, Burke appeared in the TNT drama series Rizzoli & Isles.

In 2012, he was cast as the lead in the NBC science-fiction series Revolution, created by Eric Kripke and produced by J. J. Abrams. Burke reprised his role in The Closer (Season 7, episode 16, "Hostile Witness," playing the rapist and murderer, attorney Phillip Stroh). He appeared again in the series finale, "The Last Word", in a face-off against the LAPD. He returned as Phillip Stroh in a recurring role in the "Closer" spin-off Major Crimes with an ongoing impact on the show through its finale in 2018. From 2015-17, Burke starred as veterinary pathologist Mitch Morgan in CBS's Zoo, based on the James Patterson novel. He has also appeared in the films Good After Bad (2017) and Breaking In (2018).

His most recent appearances on TV include shows like Chicago P.D., Most Dangerous Game, 9-1-1: Lone Star. He has recently starred in Maid, a new Netflix series created by Molly Smith Metzler and inspired by Stephanie Land's memoir "Maid: Hard Work, Low Pay, and a Mother’s Will to Survive", that premiered globally on October 1, 2021 and became one of the most watched shows in many different countries, earning several nominations at the 2022 AFI Awards, Critics Choice Awards and Golden Globes.

He has also voiced Commissioner James Gordon in the animated DC movies Batman: The Long Halloween, Part One and Part Two released in 2021. In 2022, he joined the cast of CBS TV Studios' new drama Fire Country that was picked up by CBS in May; Burke plays Vince Leone, a third-generation Cal Fire and the fire chief of the community of Edgewater, California.

In 2010, Burke released an album titled Removed. His second album, The Underkill, was released in 2018. His latest single is Burn, released on January 20, 2023 and featured in Fire Country episode 1x11 Mama Bear on the same day.

Filmography

Film

Television

Writer

Producer

References

External links

1966 births
Male actors from Washington (state)
American male film actors
American male television actors
Living people
People from Bellingham, Washington
20th-century American male actors
21st-century American male actors